Alexander Ilyich Gutman (29 January 1945 – 17 February 2016), also spelt as Alexandre Goutman and Aleksandr Gutman, was a Russian film director of Jewish origin. During a 30-year career, Gutman shot over 50 documentary films, 13 of them as film director. He won awards at several Russian and international film festivals.

He graduated from the Leningrad Polytechnical Institute (now known as St. Petersburg State Polytechnic University) (1968) and VGIK (1978).

Filmography
Movies

References

External links

Russian film directors
1945 births
2016 deaths
Mass media in the Jewish Autonomous Oblast
Russian Jews
Gerasimov Institute of Cinematography alumni
Soviet film directors
Russian screenwriters
Russian film producers